The Kingdom of Romania and Republic of China (ROC) began China–Romania relations on July 5, 1939. 

Following the takeover of the capital of Nanking in 1941, Romania broke off relations with the ROC and began recognizing the Japanese-backed Chinese Republic. After the surrender of Japan, relations between the two never resumed, but after the Chinese Communists seized  power in 1949 and Romania abolished the monarchy in 1947, the Romanian People's Republic recognized People's Republic of China (PRC) as the legitimate government of China on October 5 of that year. Socialist China and Romania exchanged ambassadors for the first time in March 1950. Relations between the two improved after Romania broke off ties with the Soviet Union in 1964.

The PRC operates an embassy in Bucharest and a consulate general in Constanța. Romania has an embassy in Beijing and 2 consulates general in Hong Kong and Shanghai. The modern-day Republic of China (Taiwan) has no official diplomatic relations with Romania, although it is represented by Hungary via the Hungarian Trade Office in Taipei and the ROC through the Taipei Economic and Cultural Office in Budapest.

In 2015, Romania signed an agreement with China General Nuclear Power Group for assistance in building civil nuclear power stations. Romania cancelled the deal in 2020.

See also 
 Foreign relations of the People's Republic of China
 Foreign relations of the Republic of China
 Foreign relations of Romania
 Chinese of Romania
 China–European Union relations

References

External links 
  Chinese Ministry of Foreign Affairs about relations with Romania
  Chinese embassy in Bucharest (in Chinese and Romanian only)
  Romanian embassy in Beijing

  

 
Romania
China